Empicoris rubromaculatus, the thread bug, is a species of thread-legged bug in the family Reduviidae. It is found in North America and Oceania.

References

Further reading

External links

 

Reduviidae
Insects described in 1888